During the 2020–21 season, Tigres UANL competed in the Liga MX, the latter stages of the delayed 2020 CONCACAF Champions League and the FIFA Club World Cup, having qualified for the latter competition after winning the Champions League in December 2020.

Competitive

Liga MX Guardinaes 2020

Table

Results summary

Results by round

Regular season

Playoffs

Reclassification

Quarter-finals

Guardianes 2021

CONCACAF Champions League

Quarter-finals

Semi-finals

Final

FIFA Club World Cup

References 

Tigres UANL seasons
Mexican football clubs 2020–21 season
Tigres Uanl
2020